A brain teaser is a form of puzzle that requires thought to solve. It often requires thinking in unconventional ways with given constraints in mind; sometimes it also involves lateral thinking. Logic puzzles and riddles are specific types of brain teasers.

One of the earliest known brain teaser enthusiasts was the Greek mathematician Archimedes. He devised mathematical problems for his contemporaries to solve.

Example
Q: If three hens lay three eggs in three days, how many eggs does a (statistical) hen lay in one day?
A1: One third. (Note: 3 hens = 3 eggs / 3 days → 3 hens = (3 / 3) (eggs / days) → 1 hen = (1 / 3) (egg / days))
A2: Zero or one (it's hard to lay a third of an egg).

One can argue about the answers of many brain teasers; in the given example with hens, one might claim that all the eggs in the question were laid in the first day, so the answer would be three.

Q: Mary's father has five daughters: 1. Nana, 2. Nene, 3. Nini, 4. Nono. What is the name of the fifth daughter?
A: Mary. The first four daughters all have names with the first 4 vowels, so if someone does not think about the question, they may say the name with the fifth vowel, Nunu. The answer was given at the beginning of the question (i.e., Mary's father has five...)

Q: What appears once in a minute, twice in a moment, but never in a thousand years?A: The letter "M".

Q: I am the beginning of the end, the beginning of eternity, and the end of all time?''
A: The letter "E".

Intuition
The difficulty of many brain teasers relies on a certain degree of fallacy in human intuitiveness. This is most common in brain teasers relating to conditional probability, because the causal human mind tends to consider absolute probability instead. As a result, controversial discussions emerge from such problems. One of the famous brain teasers is the Monty Hall problem. Another (simpler) example of such a brain teaser is the Boy or Girl paradox.

See also 
 Board games
 Mathematical game
 Mensa
 Mind sport
 Boy or Girl paradox
 Spot Hidden Objects

References

Puzzles